The discography of American nu metal band Korn consists of 14 studio albums, three live albums, eight compilation albums, seven video albums, three extended plays, 46 singles, 10 promotional singles and 51 music videos. Seven official releases have gone Platinum, and one Gold. 12 releases have charted top 10 in the United States.

Albums

Studio albums

Live albums

Compilation albums

Video albums

Extended plays

Singles

Promotional singles

Guest appearances

Music videos

Notes

References

External links 
 
 Korn at AllMusic
 

Discography
Heavy metal group discographies
Discographies of American artists